The 2011 Greensboro mayoral election was held on November 8, 2011 to elect the mayor of Greensboro, North Carolina. It saw the election of Robbie Perkins, who unseated incumbent mayor Bill Knight.

Results

Primary 
The date of the primary was October 11.

General election

References 

Greensboro mayoral
Mayoral elections in Greensboro, North Carolina
Greensboro